Prakash Belkale (born May 1973, Bangalore) is an Indian-American mathematician, specializing in algebraic geometry and representation theory.

Education and career
Belkale received his Ph.D. in 1999 from the University of Chicago with thesis advisor Madhav Nori.

In 2003, together with Patrick Brosnan, Belkale disproved Maxim Kontsevich's Spanning-Tree Conjecture (first published in 1997).

Belkale works on enumerative algebraic geometry, quantum cohomology and moduli spaces of vector bundles on curves (conformal blocks and strange duality), and the Schubert calculus and its connections to intersection theory and representation theory. He is a professor at the University of North Carolina at Chapel Hill.

In 2010 he was an invited speaker at the International Congress of Mathematicians in Hyderabad and gave a talk The tangent space to an enumerative problem. In December 2014 he was elected a Fellow of the American Mathematical Society.

Selected publications

References

External links
 Homepage

1973 births
Living people
Algebraic geometers
University of Chicago alumni
University of North Carolina alumni
American people of Kannada descent
20th-century Indian mathematicians
21st-century Indian mathematicians
Fellows of the American Mathematical Society
Scientists from Bangalore